Cristián Javier Cuffaro Russo (born May 18, 1988 in Rosario, Argentina) is an Argentine footballer currently playing for Huracan de Comodoro Rivadavia of the Torneo Argentino "B" in Argentina.
His natural position is central defender, with 183 cm high and 79 kg weight.

Personal life
He is the son of the Argentine coach Ariel Cuffaro Russo.

Teams
  Rosario Central 2009-2010
  Oriente Petrolero 2011
  Guabirá 2011-2012
  Huracan de Comodoro Rivadavia 2012–present

References
 
 

1988 births
Living people
Argentine footballers
Argentine expatriate footballers
Rosario Central footballers
Oriente Petrolero players
Guabirá players
Expatriate footballers in Bolivia
Association footballers not categorized by position
Footballers from Rosario, Santa Fe